Jimmy George (1955–1987) was an Indian volleyball player.

Jimmy George may also refer to:

 Jimmy George (musician) (born 1940), American musician
Jimmy George (band)
Jimmy George Indoor Stadium

See also
Jim George (disambiguation)
James George (disambiguation)